Lebrikizumab (INN) is a humanized monoclonal antibody and an experimental immunosuppressive drug for the treatment of asthma that cannot be adequately controlled with inhalable glucocorticoids. The drug was created by Tanox under the name TNX-650, and a phase I clinical trial for refractory Hodgkin’s lymphoma had been performed when Genentech acquired Tanox in 2007. It has successfully completed a Phase II clinical trial for the treatment of asthma.

, it is under phase III clinical trial for the treatment of atopic dermatitis by Almirall with expected submission for approval in 2023 in the United States and the EU.

Mechanism of action
Lebrikizumab blocks interleukin 13 (IL-13), a cytokine (cell-signalling protein) that is produced by a type of white blood cell called Th2 cells. IL-13 is thought to induce the expression of another signalling protein, periostin, by epithelial cells of the bronchi. Periostin in turn seems to partake in a number of asthma related problems, such as bronchial hyperresponsiveness, inflammation, and activation and proliferation of airway fibroblasts, which are involved in airway remodelling.

This theory is supported by the fact that patients with high periostin levels responded significantly better to lebrikizumab in the Phase II study: the forced expiratory volume in 1 second (FEV1) was 8.2% higher than under placebo in this group (measured from the respective baselines), while low-periostin patients had 1.6% higher FEV1, and the average value for all patients was 5.5%. The FEV1 increase in low-periostin patients was not statistically significant.

Side effects
In the asthma study, musculoskeletal side effects were more common under lebrikizumab than under placebo (13.2% versus 5.4%). Other side effects were comparable in both groups: infections overall 48.1% versus 49.1%, upper airway infections 12.3% versus 14.3%, and severe side effects overall 3.8% (treatment) versus 5.3% (placebo).

References 

Monoclonal antibodies
Hoffmann-La Roche brands
Genentech brands